Ctenanthe is a genus of flowering plants of the family Marantaceae described as a genus in 1884. They are evergreen perennials, native to Central and South America (primarily Brazil). They are grown for their attractive, often variegated foliage.

Species 

The genus has the following species:

Awards 

The Royal Horticultural Society's Award of Garden Merit has been awarded to the following:
Ctenanthe amabilis

References

Marantaceae
Zingiberales genera